Saréboido  is a town and sub-prefecture in the Koundara Prefecture in the Boké Region of northern Guinea, near the border of Guinea-Bissau. As of 2014 it had a population of 33,700 people.

References

Sub-prefectures of the Boké Region